Yudhistir Samantray is a leader of Indian National Congress and a former member of the Odisha Legislative Assembly. The Odisha Police arrested him in May 2016 for alleged murder of a youth leader.

References

Indian National Congress politicians
Members of the Odisha Legislative Assembly
Living people
Indian prisoners and detainees
Crime in Odisha
Year of birth missing (living people)
Indian National Congress politicians from Odisha